Andre Sepp (born 25 October 1971) is an Estonian politician. He was a member of XII and XIII Riigikogu, representing the Estonian Reform Party.

Andre Sepp graduated from Tallinn 13th Secondary School and the Estonian National Defense Academy. He worked in the Harju Police Prefecture from 1992 to 1997. He was the Mayor of Raasiku Parish from 1999 until 2011 and the chairman of the Harju County Local Government Association from 2002 until 2007. As of 31 October 2017, he was again the mayor of Raasiku Parish.

References

Living people
1971 births
Estonian Reform Party politicians
Members of the Riigikogu, 2011–2015
Members of the Riigikogu, 2015–2019
Estonian police officers
Mayors of places in Estonia
People from Raasiku Parish